Macellibacteroides is a genus from the family of Porphyromonadaceae, with one known species (Macellibacteroides fermentans).

References

Further reading 
 

Bacteroidia
Bacteria genera
Monotypic bacteria genera